Nobuchika Terado (born September 9, 1980) is a retired Japanese kickboxer. He was the 2009 AJKF and RISE Bantamweight champion, the 2011 ISKA Bantamweight and 2012 Super Bantamweight champion, as well as the 2016 Krush Super Bantamweight champion.

Combat Press ranked him as a top ten bantamweight between April and June 2018.

Kickboxing career
On August 25, 2007, Terado challenged Arashi Fujihara for the AJKF Bantamweight title. The fight ended in the fourth round, as Terado's corner decided to throw in the towel, following a series of body shots which downed their fighter.

Terado took part in the AJKF Bantamweight tournament held on January 4, 2009, to determine the new champion. He beat Nasu and Shota Takiya by unanimous decision in the semifinals and finals respectively. Two months later he won the M-1 Bantamweight title with a second-round TKO of Hiroki Maeda.

Terado won the RISE Bantamweight title with a second-round TKO of TOMONORI at RISE 60. He was scheduled to make his first title defense against Makoto Kushima at RISE 68. Terado won the fight by unanimous decision.

At Krush 11, on August 14, 2011, Terado was scheduled to fight Kieran McCaskill for the ISKA World Super Bantamweight title. He won the fight by unanimous decision.

Terado fought a rematch with Shota Takiya at Krush 15 for the Krush Super Bantamweight title. He lost the fight by a first-round knockout.

Terado fought Andy Howson at Krush 21, for his second ISKA title, the ISKA World Super Bantamweight title. He knocked Howson out in the second round.

On May 12, 2013, Terado fought Takeru Segawa at Krush 28 for the Krush Featherweight title. Takeru won the fight by unanimous decision.

Terado fought for a Krush title for the third time in his career at Krush 64, when he fought Ryuji Horio for the Krush Super Bantamweight strap. Terado won the fight by unanimous decision. Terado successfully defended his title twice before retiring, knocking out Charles Bongiovanni at Krush 69, and winning an extra round decision against Kenji Kubo at Krush 82.

Titles and accomplishments
All Japan Kickboxing Federation
 2004 AJKF Rookie of the Year Award
 2009 AJKF Bantamweight Champion
M-1 Muay Thai
 2009 M-1 Bantamweight Champion
RISE
 2009 RISE -55 kg Champion (defended once)
International Sport Karate Association
 2011 ISKA World Super Bantamweight Champion
 2012 ISKA World Bantamweight Champion (defended twice)
K-1/Krush
 2016 Krush Super Bantamweight Champion (defended twice)
Awards
eFight.jp
Fighter of the Month (August 2012)

Kickboxing record

|-  style="background:#cfc;"
| 2017-11-05|| Win||align=left| Kenji Kubo || Krush.82 || Tokyo, Japan || Ext.R Decision (Unanimous) || 4 || 3:00
|-
! style=background:white colspan=9 |
|-  style="background:#Fbb;"
| 2017-04-22|| Loss||align=left| Kenji Kubo || K-1 World GP 2017 Super Bantamweight Championship Tournament, Semi Finals || Tokyo, Japan || KO (Left Straight) || 2 || 3:00
|-  style="background:#cfc;"
| 2017-04-22|| Win||align=left| Jamie Whelan || K-1 World GP 2017 Super Bantamweight Championship Tournament, Quarter Finals || Tokyo, Japan || Ext.R Decision (Split)  || 4 || 3:00
|-  style="background:#cfc;"
| 2016-09-30|| Win||align=left| Charles Bongiovanni || Krush.69 || Tokyo, Japan || KO (3 Knocckdowns) || 1 || 3:00
|-
! style=background:white colspan=9 |
|-  style="background:#cfc;"
| 2016-03-20|| Win||align=left| Ryuji Horio || Krush.64 || Tokyo, Japan || Decision (Unanimous) || 3 || 3:00
|-
! style=background:white colspan=9 |
|-  style="background:#Fbb;"
| 2015-04-19|| Loss||align=left| Taiga || K-1 World GP 2015 -55kg Championship Tournament, Semi Finals || Tokyo, Japan || KO (Right Hook)|| 3 || 2:40
|-
|-  style="background:#cfc;"
| 2015-04-19|| Win||align=left| Rui Botelho || K-1 World GP 2015 -55kg Championship Tournament, Quarter Finals || Tokyo, Japan || Ext.R Decision (Split)|| 3 || 3:00
|-  style="background:#cfc;"
| 2014-11-09|| Win ||align=left| Kunihiro || KICKBOXING ZONE || Tokyo, Japan || Decision (Unanimous) || 5 || 3:00
|-  style="background:#cfc;"
| 2014-07-13|| Win||align=left| Vedat Uruc || Krush.43 || Tokyo, Japan || KO (Left Hook) || 1 || 1:03
|-
! style=background:white colspan=9 |
|-  style="background:#cfc;"
| 2014-02-14|| Win||align=left| Yuya Suzuki || Krush.38 || Tokyo, Japan || Decision (Unanimous) || 3 || 3:00
|-  style="background:#cfc;"
| 2013-08-25|| Win||align=left| Alexander Prilip || Krush.31 ～in HIROSHIMA～ || Hiroshima, Japan || Decision (Unanimous) || 5 || 3:00
|-
! style=background:white colspan=9 |
|-  style="background:#Fbb;"
| 2013-05-12|| Loss||align=left| Takeru || Krush.28 –58 kg Tournament Final || Tokyo, Japan || Decision (Unanimous) || 3 || 3:00
|-
! style=background:white colspan=9 |
|-  style="background:#cfc;"
| 2013-03-20|| Win ||align=left| Shota Kanbe || Krush.27 || Tokyo, Japan || Decision (Unanimous) || 3 || 3:00
|-  style="background:#cfc;"
| 2013-01-26|| Win ||align=left| KO-ICHI || Krush.26 || Tokyo, Japan || TKO (Corner Stoppage) || 3 || 1:04
|-  style="background:#cfc;"
| 2012-08-12|| Win||align=left| Andy Howson || Krush.21 || Tokyo, Japan || KO (Right Cross)  || 2 || 2:07
|-
! style=background:white colspan=9 |
|-  style="background:#cfc;"
| 2012-04-22|| Win ||align=left| Namito Izawa || Krush－EX 2012 vol.1 || Tokyo, Japan ||Decision (Unanimous) || 3 || 3:00
|-  style="background:#FFBBBB;"
| 2012-01-09|| Loss||align=left| Shota Takiya || Krush 15 || Tokyo, Japan ||KO (Jumping Knee)|| 1 || 1:11
|-
! style=background:white colspan=9 |
|-  style="background:#cfc;"
| 2011-08-14|| Win||align=left| Kieran McCaskill || Krush.11 || Tokyo, Japan || Decision (Unanimous) || 5 || 3:00
|-
! style=background:white colspan=9 |
|-  style="background:#cfc;"
| 2011-05-29|| Win||align=left| Ju Miho || Krush -70 kg Champion Inaugural Tournament ~First Round~|| Tokyo, Japan || TKO (Punches) || 1 || 2:04
|-  style="background:#FFBBBB;"
| 2010-12-12|| Loss||align=left| Ryūya Kusakabe || Krush -55 kg Champion Inaugural Tournament ~First Round~|| Tokyo, Japan || Decision (Unanimous) || 3 || 3:00
|-  style="background:#cfc;"
| 2010-07-31|| Win||align=left| Makoto Kushima || RISE 68|| Tokyo, Japan || Decision (Unanimous) || 5 || 3:00
|-
! style=background:white colspan=9 |
|-  style="background:#cfc;"
| 2010-03-13|| Win||align=left| Kenji Kubo || Krush × Survivor|| Tokyo, Japan || KO (Punches)|| 2 || 2:26
|-  style="background:#cfc;"
| 2009-11-22|| Win||align=left| TOMONORI || RISE 60|| Tokyo, Japan || TKO (3 Knockdowns) || 2 || 1:54
|-
! style=background:white colspan=9 |
|-  style="background:#cfc;"
| 2009-09-22|| Win||align=left| Takayuki Umehara || Krush.4|| Tokyo, Japan || Decision (Unanimous) || 3 || 3:00
|-  style="background:#FFBBBB;"
| 2009-06-21|| Loss||align=left| Norasing Lukbanyai || AJKF Norainu Dengekisakusen|| Tokyo, Japan || TKO (3 Knockdowns) || 2 || 1:12
|-  style="background:#cfc;"
| 2009-03-01|| Win||align=left| Hiroki Maeda || M-1 FAIRTEX Muay Thai Challenge 2009 Yod Nak Suu vol.1|| Japan || TKO (Right Cross) || 2 || 0:24
|-
! style=background:white colspan=9 |
|-  style="background:#cfc;"
| 2009-01-04|| Win||align=left| Shota Takiya ||AJKF NEW Year Kick Festival 2009, Bantamweight Championship Tournament final || Tokyo, Japan || Decision (Unanimous) || 5 || 3:00
|-
! style=background:white colspan=9 |
|-  style="background:#cfc;"
| 2009-01-04|| Win||align=left| Nasu ||AJKF NEW Year Kick Festival 2009, Bantamweight Championship Tournament Semi final|| Tokyo, Japan || Decision (Unanimous) || 3 || 3:00
|-  style="background:#FFBBBB;"
| 2008-11-08|| Loss||align=left| Wanlop Weerasakreck ||AJKF Krush！～Kickboxing Destruction～|| Tokyo, Japan || Decision (Unanimous) || 3 || 3:00
|-  style="background:#cfc;"
| 2008-08-10|| Win||align=left| Rungrom Sikrom||M-1 FAIRTEX Muay Thai Challenge Legend　of elbows 2008 ～YODMUAY～|| Japan || TKO (Low Kicks) || 2 || 1:11
|-  style="background:#cfc;"
| 2008-06-22|| Win||align=left| Nasu||AJKF|| Tokyo, Japan || Ext.R Decision (Unanimous) || 3 || 3:00
|-  style="background:#FFBBBB;"
| 2008-03-09|| Loss||align=left| Wanlop Weerasakreck ||M-1 FAIRTEX Muay Thai Challenge Legend of elbows 2008 ～CRASH～|| Japan || TKO (Dcotor Stoppage)|| 1 || 1:49
|-  style="background:#cfc;"
| 2007-11-18|| Win||align=left| Shuichi Wentz ||AJKF|| Tokyo, Japan || KO (Low Kick) || 3 || 1:51
|-  style="background:#FFBBBB;"
| 2007-08-25|| Loss||align=left| Arashi Fujihara ||AJKF Kick Return/Kickboxer of the best 60 Tournament ～First Round～|| Tokyo, Japan || TKO (Towel thrown) || 4 || 2:06
|-
! style=background:white colspan=9 |
|-  style="background:#cfc;"
| 2007-06-09|| Win||align=left| Chae Jin Soon ||AJKF CUB☆KICK’S-6|| Tokyo, Japan || KO (Punches)|| 1 || 2:59
|-  style="background:#cfc;"
| 2007-04-15|| Win||align=left| Hideya Nagasaki ||AJKF New Deal|| Tokyo, Japan || Decision (Unanimous) || 3 || 3:00
|-  style="background:#cfc;"
| 2007-01-08|| Win||align=left| Yuzo Maki ||J-NETWORK The Starting Point of J|| Tokyo, Japan || KO (Flying knee)|| 2 || 1:16
|-  style="background:#FFBBBB;"
| 2006-09-24|| Loss||align=left| Takashi Yoneda ||NJKF 55 kg Championship Tournament, Semi Final|| Tokyo, Japan || Decision (Unanimous) || 5 || 3:00
|-  style="background:#cfc;"
| 2006-07-22|| Win||align=left| Shinji ||NJKF 55 kg Championship Tournament, Quarter Final|| Tokyo, Japan || Decision (Unanimous) || 5 || 3:00
|-  style="background:#cfc;"
| 2006-05-14|| Win||align=left| Shinji ||AJKF CROSSOVER|| Japan || Decision (Unanimous) || 3 || 3:00
|-  style="background:#cfc;"
| 2006-03-19|| Win||align=left| Makoto Warisawa ||AJKF SWORD FIGHT 2006～Japan VS Thailand・5vs5|| Japan || KO (Punches) || 1 || 1:01
|-  style="background:#cfc;"
| 2005-12-17|| Win||align=left| Kongtanan Petchyindee ||Lumpinee Stadium, Krikkri Fights|| Bangkok, Thailand || KO || 2 ||
|-  style="background:#cfc;"
| 2005-09-16|| Win||align=left| Naoki Tsuji ||AJKF STACK OF ARMS|| Japan || Decision (Unanimous) || 3 || 3:00
|-  style="background:#cfc;"
| 2005-07-24|| Win||align=left| Kwon Minseok||AJKF SUPER FIGHT|| Japan || Decision (Unanimous) || 3 || 3:00
|-  style="background:#cfc;"
| 2005-04-23|| Win||align=left| Reece Crooke ||PAIN and GLORY|| England || TKO (Doctor stoppage) || 3 ||
|-  style="background:#FFBBBB;"
| 2005-03-02|| Loss||align=left| Kunitaka Fujiwara ||J-NETWORK GO! GO! J-NET ’05 -MACH 5-Tournament, Quarter Finals|| Japan || TKO || 3 ||2:45
|-  style="background:#cfc;"
| 2005-02-06|| Win||align=left| Miki Urabayashi ||AJKF MOVING|| Japan || Decision (Unanimous) || 3 || 3:00
|-  style="background:#cfc;"
| 2004-11-14|| Win||align=left| Keiji Chiba ||J-NETWORK UNLIMITED 11.14 -MasterX Collabo-|| Japan || Decision (Unanimous) || 3 || 3:00
|-  style="background:#cfc;"
| 2004-09-23|| Win||align=left| Hiroaki Mizuhara ||AJKF DANGER ZONE|| Japan || KO || 3 || 2:53
|-  style="background:#c5d2ea;"
| 2004-05-16|| Draw||align=left| Hiroaki Mizuhara ||AJKF DANGER ZONE|| Japan || Decision || 3 || 3:00
|-  style="background:#cfc;"
| 2004-03-28|| Win||align=left| Masaru Fujii ||J-NETWORK Kick Squad 2|| Japan || Decision (Unanimous) || 3 || 3:00
|-  style="background:#cfc;"
| 2003-12-07|| Win||align=left| Koichi Ueyama ||AJKF Fujiwara Festival || Japan || Decision (Unanimous) || 3 || 3:00
|-
| colspan=9 | Legend:

See also
 List of male kickboxers

References

Living people
1980 births
Japanese male kickboxers
Flyweight kickboxers
Sportspeople from Shimane Prefecture